Ratu Bagus (November 1949 - August 12, 2021) was an Indonesian guru based in Bali, who developed a technique of Shaking Meditation, which he called "Bio-energy Shaking Meditation." He was said to transmit healing energy through his touch and  picture, induce spontaneous shaking and laughing in the recipients, as well as to release them from physical, emotional, mental and spiritual blocks.  Ratu Bagus following in the world has grown to include many shaking groups in Europe and Australia as well as one group in the United States of America.

See also 
Energy (esotericism)
Meditation
Shaktipat

Sources 

Balinese people
Founders of new religious movements
Living people
Indonesian Hindu religious leaders
20th-century Hindu religious leaders
21st-century Hindu religious leaders
Hindu religious leaders
1949 births